Penny Parker was the heroine of a series of 17 books written by Mildred Wirt (Benson) and published from 1939 through 1947. Penny was a high school student turned sleuth who also sporadically worked as a reporter for her father's newspaper, The Riverview Star. Her mother, similar to Nancy Drew's, had died some years before, so she was raised by the Parker housekeeper, Mrs. Weems. On her cases she is sometimes aided by her close friend, brunette Louise Sidell, and occasionally Jerry Livingston or Salt Sommers who were, respectively, a reporter and photographer for her father's paper.

The Penny Parker stories are currently (as of December 2022) in Development with Shady Hill Films as a series of feature-length episodes called "The Penny Parker Mysteries".

Benson's Reaction and Similarities to her life
Benson, who was a newspaper reporter herself, favored Penny Parker over all the other books she wrote, including Nancy Drew. Her obituary quoted her as saying, " 'I always thought Penny Parker was a better Nancy Drew than Nancy is,' Mrs. Benson said in 1993.".

Titles
 Tale of the Witch Doll (1939, 1958)
 The Vanishing Houseboat (1939, 1958)
 Danger at the Drawbridge (1940, 1958)
 Behind the Green Door (1940, 1958)
 Clue of the Silken Ladder (1941)
 The Secret Pact (1941)
 The Clock Strikes Thirteen (1942)
 The Wishing Well (1942)
 Saboteurs on the River (1943)
 Ghost Beyond the Gate (1943)
 Hoofbeats on the Turnpike (1944)
 Voice from the Cave (1944)
 The Guilt of the Brass Thieves (1945)
 Signal in the Dark (1946)
 Whispering Walls (1946)
 Swamp Island (1947)
 The Cry at Midnight (1947)

Unreleased title
There are extant notes for an 18th book, which was never completed.

Revivals
The first four books were lightly revised and reprinted in 1958; the project went no further, and Benson decided not to do Nancy-Drew-like updates on her own series (the first revised titles came out the next year).

In 1980, when the court case between the Stratemeyer Syndicate and Grosset & Dunlap, a Penny Parker revival was in the process, but the plans never came into fruition.

In 2010 to 2011, Halcyon Press reprinted the complete 17 book series in Kindle format as The Penny Parker Mystery Series volumes I and II.  In 2012, Wildside Press reprinted numbers 3-17 of the series in the Penny Parker Megapack.   Individual titles are also available in Kindle format.

Characters
Penny Parker- a high-school student with a skill at reporting and getting involved in mystery. Her impulsiveness can get her into hot water. She is the daughter of Anthony Parker and was first introduced in Tale of the Witch Doll and appeared in all seventeen books.

Anthony Parker- Penny's widowed father and the owner of The Riverview Star. He gives her much freedom but rather disapproves of her sleuthing. First introduced in Tale of the Witch Doll, he appeared in every book.

Mrs. Maude Weems- the Parker family housekeeper; since the death of Mrs. Parker, she has cared for Penny as her own. Like Penny's father, she disapproves of the girl's sleuthing. Mrs. Weems made her first appearance in Tale of the Witch Doll and showed up in fifteen other books.

Louise Sidell- Penny's "closest friend", Louise is more cautious and less athletic than her chum. Though often reluctant to join Penny, she almost always gives in. She enjoys teasing Penny about Jerry Livingston. Louise debuted in Tale of the Witch Doll and made appearances in sixteen books overall, (all but Guilt of the Brass Thieves).

Jerry Livingston- a "crack reporter" on The Riverview Star, Jerry serves as a love interest for Penny. Showing up in fourteen books, Jerry's first appearance was a brief one in Tale of the Witch Doll.

Salt Sommers- a photographer on The Riverview Star and part-time airplane spotter, he is a good friend of Penny's. Salt appeared in eleven books, debuting in Danger at the Drawbridge.

Mr. DeWitt (sometimes spelled Dewitt) - the Star's gruff but competent city editor. He was first introduced in Tale of the Witch Doll and appeared in thirteen books overall.

Character Notes

 Penny and her father were the only members of the main cast to appear in every book. Salt missed six, Mr. DeWitt missed four, Jerry missed three, and Louise and Mrs. Weems each missed one.
 Salt was the only main cast member not introduced in the first book, Tale of the Witch Doll. He didn't appear until the third installment of the series, Danger at the Drawbridge.
 Penny has blonde hair and blue eyes in most of the stories and is considered slim and athletic. However, she is said to have “auburn” hair in “Saboteurs on the River.” She is revealed to be fifteen years-old in “Voice from the Cave.” 
 Louise is a brunette, and described as plump. But her age is never revealed in any of the books.
 In Danger at the Drawbridge, Salt is described as having a deep scar on his left cheek.
 In Saboteurs on the River, Louise said she was going to be a nurse.
 Louise has a younger brother, Ted, who is only mentioned in the first book.
 Jerry was absent for two books (Hoofbeats on the Turnpike and Signal in the Dark) on military leave. Though it is not explicitly stated, it is presumed that he is also on leave during The Guilt of the Brass Thieves, considering the succession of the books.

References

External links 
 The Penny Parker Mystery Stories, Series Books for Girls
 The Newsworthy Tales of Penny Parker, The Mildred A. Wirt Benson Website
 Mildred A. Wirt at Project Gutenberg, contains e-texts of most of the books.
 Penny Parker books at LibriVox (public domain audiobooks)
 The Mildred A. Wirt Benson Website- Page

Book series introduced in 1939
Female characters in literature
Literary characters introduced in 1939
Juvenile series
Series of children's books
Novel series by featured character
Children's mystery novels
Parker, Penny